Portrait of a Legend: 1951–1964 is a compilation album by American singer-songwriter Sam Cooke, released posthumously on June 17, 2003, by ABKCO Records. The disc covers Cooke's entire career, from his early 1950s beginnings with the Soul Stirrers to the posthumous 1964 single "Shake". The collection includes most of the singer's hit singles, including "You Send Me", "Wonderful World", "Chain Gang", "Cupid", "Twistin' the Night Away", "Bring It On Home to Me", "Another Saturday Night", "Little Red Rooster", "Ain't That Good News", "Good Times", and what is often regarded as Cooke’s magnum opus, "A Change Is Gonna Come".

The compilation is generally considered the most complete and comprehensive collection of Cooke's work. It has been included on various "best-of" lists by music publications, including Rolling Stone and Time.

Reception

Biographer Peter Guralnick, author of Cooke's biography Dream Boogie and the liner notes for the disc, writes: "For an overview of Sam's career, from his gospel beginnings through 'A Change Is Gonna Come,' nothing can compare to Portrait of a Legend which serves as a guide to Sam at his very best." The BBC's Alwyn Turner writes, "With perfect sound quality, and with sleeve-notes by Peter Guralnick, this is the best single-volume introduction to his work available." Bruce Eder of AllMusic considered it an improvement on the 1986 compilation The Man and His Music in terms of running time and audio quality; he did, however, lament the lack of inclusion of "'That's Heaven to Me' and 'Soothe Me', arguably one of Cooke's most important songs."

It is Cooke's highest placing position on Rolling Stone 2003 list of the 500 Greatest Albums of All-Time, at number 107, maintaining the rating in a 2012 revised list, dropping to number 307 in a 2020 revised list. In 2010, Time included the compilation on their list of the All-TIME 100 Albums, covering "the 100 greatest and most influential musical compilations since 1954." In the article, Alan Light writes, "The 31 tracks on Portrait of a Legend impressively capture Cooke’s range on a single disc […] Many artists are called "legends," but Sam Cooke truly earned this title."

Track listing

There is an additional track containing a segment of an interview by Magnificent Montague from 1963 in which Sam Cooke hums a few bars.

Personnel
All credits adapted from the disc's liner notes.

Sam Cooke – vocals, producer
Michael Gochanour – analog to digital transfers
Rick Essig – analog to digital transfers
Teri Landi – analog to digital transfers
Ben Bailes – assistant engineer
Matt Boynton – assistant engineer
Tom Camuso – assistant engineer
Jimmie Haskell – arrangement, conducting
René Hall – arrangement, conducting, guitar, producer
Alisa Coleman-Ritz – art direction
Iris W. Keitel – art direction
April Hobbs – art production coordinator
Seth Adkins – art production coordinator
Laura Walton – audio production coordinator
Alicia Adams – backing vocals
Betty Baker – backing vocals
Betty Jane Barker – backing vocals
Carol Lee Lombard – backing vocals
Charles Parlato – backing vocals
Doreen Tryden – backing vocals
Jack Halloran – backing vocals
Jackie Ward – backing vocals
James Bryant – backing vocals
J.J. Farley – backing vocals
Jimmie Outler – backing vocals
Lee Gotch – backing vocals
Loulie Jean Norman – backing vocals
Lou Rawls – backing vocals
Paul Foster – backing vocals
R.B. Robinson – backing vocals
Ralph Brewster – backing vocals
Richard Gibbs – backing vocals
Robert Tebold – backing vocals
Sally Stevens Castle  – backing vocals
S.R. Crain – backing vocals
Sue Allen – backing vocals
Thomas D. Kenny – backing vocals
Thomas L. Bruster – backing vocals
Adolphus Alsbrook – bass guitar
Chuck Badie – bass guitar
Clifford Hils – bass guitar
Eddie Tilman – bass guitar
Frank Fields – bass guitar
Harper Cosby – bass guitar
James Bond – bass guitar
Milton Hinton – bass guitar
Ray Pohlman – bass guitar
Red Callender – bass guitar
Ted Brinson – bass guitar
Jack Costanza – bongos
Armand Kaproff – cello
Cecil Figelski – cello
Emmet Sargeant – cello
Frederick Seykora – cello
Jesse Ehrlich – cello

Joseph Coppin – cello
Leanne Allik – conception
Glen Osser – conductor
Sammy Lowe – conductor
Angelo Tillery – cover illustration
Hiroyuki Komuro – DSD assistant
Gus Skinas – DSD
Charles Blackwell – drums
David Francis – drums
Earl Palmer – drums 
John Boudreaux – drums
June Gardner – drums
Ronald Selico – drums
Edward Hall – drums, percussion
Frank Capp – drums, percussion
Hal Blaine – drums, percussion
Julius Wechter – drums, percussion
Al Schmitt – engineer
Dave Hassinger – engineer
Dick Bogart – engineer
Dino Lapis – engineer
Barney Kessel – guitar
Bob King – guitar
Bobby Womack – guitar
Clifton White – guitar
Edgar Blanchard – guitar
George Barnes (musician) – guitar
Everett Barksdale – guitar
Glen Campbell – guitar
Howard Roberts – guitar
John Pisano – guitar
LeRoy Crume – guitar
Norman Bartold – guitar
Tommy Tedesco – guitar
Ulysses Livingston – guitar
William Pitman – guitar
Joseph Gibbons – guitar, banjo
William Hinshaw – French horn
Peter J. Howard – legal
Peter Guralnick – liner notes
Hillary Putnam – manufacturing
Kenneth Silinsky – manufacturing
Emil Radocchia – marimba, timpani, percussion
Bob Ludwig – mastering
Billy Preston – organ
Jess Rand – photography
Edward Beal – piano
Ernest Freeman – piano
Ernie Hayes – piano 
Harold Battiste – piano 
Raymond Johnson – piano
Russell Bridges – piano
Warren Myles – piano
Al Schmitt – producer 
Art Rupe – producer
Hugo & Luigi – producer

Lou Adler – producer
Bumps Blackwell – producer
Jody H. Klein – reissue producer
Teri Landi – reissue producer
Joe Parker – sales
Red Tyler – saxophone
Edgar Redmond – saxophone
Jewell Grant – saxophone
John Kelsom – saxophone
Plas Johnson – saxophone
William Green – saxophone
Maria Papazahariou – session research
Steve Rosenthal – sound restoration
David Wells – trombone
John Ewing – trombone
Louis Blackburn – trombone
Anthony Terran – trumpet
John Anderson – trumpet
Melvin Lastie – trumpet
Stuart Williamson – trumpet
Lawrence Bunker – vibraphone
Allan Harshman – viola
Alexander Neiman – viola
Harry Hyams – viola
Irving Weinper – viola
Samuel Boghossian – viola
Wilbert Nuttycombe – viola
Ambrose Russo – violin
Alfred Brown – violin
Archie Levin – violin
Arnold Belnick – violin
Ben Miller – violin
Charles Libove – violin
Darrel Terwilliger – violin
David Nadien – violin
Elliot Fisher – violin
Fred Fradkin – violin
Gareth Nuttycombe – violin
Harold Dickterow – violin
Harry Lookofsky – violin
Hinda Barnet – violin
Irving Lipschultz – violin
Isadore Roman – violin
Israel Baker – violin
John DeVoogdt – violin
Joseph Saxon – violin
Leonard Malarsky – violin
Marshall Sosson – violin
Marvin Limonick – violin
Max Cahn – violin
Myron Sandler – violin
Ralph Schaeffer – violin
Robert Barene – violin
Sidney Sharp – violin
Tibor Zelig – violin
William Kurasch – violin

Charts

Weekly charts

Year-end charts

Certifications

References

External links

Portrait of a Legend: 1951–1964 at YouTube (streamed copy where licensed)

Sam Cooke compilation albums
2003 greatest hits albums
ABKCO Records compilation albums
Albums produced by Hugo & Luigi
Albums produced by Robert Blackwell
Albums produced by Lou Adler
Albums arranged by René Hall
Albums conducted by René Hall
Albums arranged by Glenn Osser
Albums conducted by Glenn Osser
Albums arranged by Jimmie Haskell